Gonzalo Damián Godoy Silva (born January 17, 1988), known as Gonzalo Godoy, is a Uruguayan footballer who plays as a centre back or full-back for The Strongest.

Notes

External links
 
 

1988 births
Living people
Uruguayan footballers
Uruguayan expatriate footballers
Uruguayan Primera División players
Chilean Primera División players
TFF First League players
Peruvian Primera División players
Bolivian Primera División players
Club Nacional de Football players
Liverpool F.C. (Montevideo) players
C.A. Cerro players
Ñublense footballers
Yeni Malatyaspor footballers
Sud América players
Club Alianza Lima footballers
The Strongest players
Association football defenders
Uruguayan expatriate sportspeople in Chile
Uruguayan expatriate sportspeople in Turkey
Uruguayan expatriate sportspeople in Peru
Uruguayan expatriate sportspeople in Bolivia
Expatriate footballers in Chile
Expatriate footballers in Turkey
Expatriate footballers in Peru
Expatriate footballers in Bolivia